Elections to Hyndburn Borough Council were held on 3 May 2007. One third of the council was up for election and the Conservative party stayed in overall control of the council. Labour had held one by election (Spring Hill) and won another from the Conservatives (Rishton) in Autumn 2006.

After the election, the composition of the council was
Conservative 18
Labour 15
Independent 2

Election result

The four (out of 16) Hyndburn Local Borough Council ward seats that were NOT up for re-election in 2007 included the following wards - Netherton in Gt. Harwood, Peel and Spring Hill in Accrington, plus St. Andrews in Oswaldtwistle.

Ward results

References
2007 Hyndburn election result
Ward results

2007 English local elections
2007
2000s in Lancashire